Taroudant is a province in the Moroccan region of Souss-Massa. Its population in 2004 was 780,661.

The major cities and towns are:
 Ait Iaaza
 Aoulouz
 El Guerdane
 Irherm
 Oulad Berhil
 Oulad Teima
 Taliouine
 Taroudant

Subdivisions
The province is divided administratively into the following:

References

 
Taroudant Province